Athletic & Running Club de Bruxelles was a Belgian football club created in 1883.  It was the only club admitted to the first division after the first season in Belgian football, in 1896.  It stayed at this level until 1905 when it withdrew.  The club achieved its best ranking in 1900 finishing 3rd on 6.  Finally, Athletic & Running Club retired in 1909.

References
Belgian football clubs history
RSSSF Archive

Association football clubs established in 1883
Athletic and Running Club
Association football clubs disestablished in 1909
1883 establishments in Belgium
1909 disestablishments in Belgium
Defunct football clubs in Belgium
Belgian Pro League clubs